Robert Sweeney or Sweeny may refer to:

 Robert Augustus Sweeney (1853–1890), American, two-time recipient of the Medal of Honor
 Robert E. Sweeney (1924–2007), American politician
 Robert K. Sweeney (born 1949), American politician
 Robert Sweeny Jr. (1911–1983), American amateur golfer and socialite

See also
 Bob Sweeney (disambiguation)